Come into My Life is the second solo album from Jermaine Jackson. Released in 1973, Come Into My Life charted during the summer of 1973, hitting #30 on R&B and #152 on the pop charts.

The album was arranged by Greg Poree, Fonce Mizell, Freddie Perren, H. B. Barnum, David Van De Pitte, David Blumberg, James Anthony Carmichael and The Corporation. The cover photography was by Jim Britt with Berry Gordy being the executive producer.

Track listing
Side A
"Sitting on the Edge of My Mind" (Charlotte O'Hara, Donald Fletcher, Nita Garfield) - 4:12 	
"You're in Good Hands" (Fonce Mizell, Larry Mizell) - 3:17 	
"I Need You More Now Than Ever" (Clay McMurray, Marty Coleman, Richard Drapkin) - 4:06 	
"If You Don't Love Me" (Pat Livingston, Rich Cason) - 2:45 	
"A Million to One" (Phil Medley) - 2:35

Side B
"The Bigger You Love (The Harder You Fall)" (Jerry Marcellino, Mel Larson) - 3:25 	
"Does Your Mama Know About Me" (Thomas Chong, Tom Baird) - 3:09 	
"Come into My Life" (Marcellino, Larson, Ron Rancifer) - 2:53
"So in Love" (Earl Moss) - 3:38 	
"Ma" (Norman Whitfield) - 4:30

Charts

Singles

References

External links

1973 albums
Jermaine Jackson albums
Albums arranged by H. B. Barnum
Albums produced by Hal Davis
Albums produced by the Mizell Brothers
Albums produced by Freddie Perren
Albums produced by the Corporation (record production team)
Motown albums